Frank Ginn (born May 23, 1962) is an American politician who has served in the Georgia State Senate from the 47th district since 2011.

Ginn graduated from the University of Georgia with a Bachelor of Science in Agricultural Engineering in 1985.

References

1962 births
Living people
Republican Party Georgia (U.S. state) state senators
University of Georgia alumni
21st-century American politicians